KMLB (1440 AM) is a former commercial radio station licensed to Monroe, Louisiana. It debuted in 1930, and was deleted in 2008.

History

The station was first licensed in 1930, as KMLB, to J. C. Liner at 512 South Grand Street in Monroe, for 50 watts on 1200 kHz.  KMLB first signed on on July 1, 1930.  It was founded by the Liner Family of Monroe. In July 1946, the station signed on an FM sister station, KMLB-FM, eventually broadcasting on 104.1 MHz (now KJLO-FM).

The station call letters were changed to KWEZ on March 3, 1986, to KJLO on February 28, 1989, and back to the original KMLB on January 18, 1991.

Expanded Band assignment

On March 17, 1997 the Federal Communications Commission (FCC) announced that eighty-eight stations had been given permission to move to newly available "Expanded Band" transmitting frequencies, ranging from 1610 to 1700 kHz, with KMLB authorized to move from 1440 kHz to 1680 kHz.

A construction permit for the expanded band station was assigned the call letters KBJE (now KRJO) on September 4, 1998. The FCC's initial policy was that both the original station and its expanded band counterpart could operate simultaneously for up to five years, after which owners would have to turn in one of the two licenses, depending on whether they preferred the new assignment or elected to remain on the original frequency. However, this deadline was extended multiple times, and both stations continued to be authorized beyond the initial time limit.

Later history

In November 2006, the Noe family reached an agreement to sell KNOE (540 AM) to Clay Holladay's Holladay Broadcasting. This sales agreement placed KNOE and KMLB (1440 AM) under common ownership. The FCC placed a restriction on the sale that: "This grant is subject to the following condition: Consummation of this transaction is subject to the prior or concurrent cancellation of the license for KMLB(AM), Monroe, Louisiana (Facility ID #48636)".

All programming was consolidated on 540 AM from 1440 AM. The original KMLB on 1440 AM was taken off the air, with its license surrendered to the FCC on March 4, 2008. Thirteen days later, the call letters on 540 AM were changed from KNOE to KMLB.

References

External links
FCC History Cards for KMLB 1440 AM (covering 1930-1979)

Radio stations established in 1930
Radio stations disestablished in 2008
Defunct radio stations in the United States
1930 establishments in Louisiana
2008 disestablishments in Louisiana
Defunct mass media in Louisiana